The Out of Order Tour was a 1988–89 worldwide tour held by British singer Rod Stewart to promote his album at that time, Out of Order. The tour visited the Americas. It began on July 1, 1988 on San Juan, Puerto Rico and ended on August 13, 1989 on St. John's, Canada.

Setlist

Tour dates

Tour band 
 Rod Stewart – vocals
 Jeff Golub – guitars, backing vocals
 Stevie Salas – guitars, backing vocals
 Carmine Rojas – bass, backing vocals
 Tony Brock – drums
 Chuck Kentis – keyboards
 Jimmy Roberts – saxophone
 Nick Lane – trombone
 Rick Braun – trumpet, keyboards

References

1988 concert tours
1989 concert tours
Rod Stewart concert tours